Jeddah Tower, previously known as Kingdom Tower, is a skyscraper construction project currently on hold.

There was steady progress, but in January 2018, building owner JEC halted structural concrete work with the tower about one-third completed due to labor problems with a contractor following the 2017–2019 Saudi Arabian purge.

The design, created by American architect Adrian Smith, who also designed the Burj Khalifa, incorporates many unique structural and aesthetic features. The creator and leader of the project is Saudi Arabian prince Al-Waleed bin Talal, a grandson of Ibn Saud, and nephew of the Kings of Saudi Arabia after Ibn Saud. Al-Waleed is the chairman of Kingdom Holding Company (KHC), which is a partner in the Jeddah Economic Company (JEC), which was formed in 2009 for the development of Jeddah Tower and City.

Overview

The building has been designed to a height of at least  (the exact height is being kept private while in development, similar to the Burj Khalifa). At about one kilometre, Jeddah Tower would be the tallest building or structure in the world to date, standing  taller than the Burj Khalifa in Dubai, United Arab Emirates.
Jeddah Tower's  plot, along with surrounding buildings, will be the first of a three-phase Jeddah Economic City development. Jeddah Economic City was designed by HOK Architects, and is estimated to cost at least SR75 billion (US$20 billion) and take around ten years to build.

The development is envisioned to grow into a new district of Jeddah. The second phase of the project will be the infrastructure development needed to support the city, and the third phase has not yet been revealed.

The focal point of the development and Jeddah Tower's primary use will be to house a Four Seasons hotel, Four Seasons short-rental apartments, Class A office space, and luxury condominiums. The tower will also have the world's highest observatory. Although the Jeddah Economic City plot is nearly isolated from the current urban core of Jeddah, no land tracts of such size were available closer to the city. Northward is generally considered the direction in which the city will spread in the future.

The primary designer of Jeddah Tower is Chicago based architect Adrian Smith of Adrian Smith + Gordon Gill Architecture (AS + GG), the same architect who designed the Burj Khalifa while he was working for Skidmore, Owings & Merrill (SOM), for which he worked almost 40 years. AS + GG was formed in 2006 by Adrian Smith, Gordon Gill, and Robert Forest. The development of the tower is being managed by Emaar Properties PJSC. Thornton Tomasetti has been selected as the structural engineering firm, and Environmental Systems Design, Inc. (ESD) is a part of the AS + GG design team that serves as the building services engineering consultants.

On 2 August 2011, it was publicly announced by Kingdom Holding, the investment company, that a contract had been signed by Saudi Binladin Group (SBG), that construction was going to start soon, and that the tower was expected to take 63 months to complete. While the official construction estimate is five years and three months (63 months), others calculate that it will take significantly longer, over seven years, based on the duration of Burj Khalifa's construction, which was over six years (with the help of CQC Department).

Besix Group (Belgian Six Construct), which constructed the Burj Khalifa, was previously considered for the contract, but did not win, partially because SBG invested in Jeddah Economic Company (JEC) contributing SR1.5 billion (US$400 million) towards the development of the project. Besix admitted in 2010 that they expected Binladin Group to win the contract. Jeddah Economic Company is a closed joint stock company (PJSC) formed in 2009 as a financial entity for Jeddah Tower and Jeddah Economic City. It is made up primarily of financiers (stakeholders) Kingdom Holding Company (33.35%), Abrar Holding Company (33.35%), which is owned by Samaual Bakhsh and businessman Abdulrahman Hassan Sharbately (16.67%), as well as the tower's own contractor, Saudi Binladin Group (16.63%). Kingdom Holding is an investment company founded in 1980 and 95% owned by Al-Waleed bin Talal that has assets valued at over $25 billion, with interests in many major companies such as Walt Disney, PepsiCo, Kodak, Apple, Hewlett Packard, Motorola, Time Warner, Newscorp, Pinnacle Infotech Solutions and Citigroup, as well as real estate in London through its Songbird Estates division.

Construction history
In May 2008, soil testing in the area cast doubt over whether the proposed location could support a skyscraper of the proposed one-kilometer height, and MEED reported that the project had been scaled back, making it "up to  shorter." Work on the foundation was scheduled to begin towards the end of 2012. Statements that construction would soon begin were made starting in 2008. In August 2011, the start of construction was slated as "no later than December." This meant the tower was expected to be completed in 2017, though at that time it was also possible that it could still have been completed by the date the media continued to publish, which was the prior estimate of late 2016. Only if construction had begun promptly and gone smoothly could a late 2016 completion have been achieved.

Reports in 2009 suggested that the project had been put on hold due to the Global financial crisis of 2008–2009 and that Bechtel (the initial engineering firm for this project) was "in the process of ending its involvement with the project." Kingdom Holding Company quickly criticized the news reports, insisting that the project had not been shelved.

Architect selected 
In March 2010, Adrian Smith of Adrian Smith + Gordon Gill Architecture (AS + GG) was selected as the preliminary architect (though they deny involvement in the earlier, mile-high designs). Later, when the proposal was more serious, they won a design competition between eight leading architectural firms including Kohn Pedersen Fox, Pickard Chilton, Pelli Clarke Pelli, and Foster + Partners, as well as the firm Smith formerly worked for Skidmore, Owings and Merrill, which was the final competitor in the competition before AS + GG was chosen. In addition to Burj Khalifa, Adrian Smith has designed several other recent towers; the Zifeng Tower in Nanjing, China, the Trump International Hotel & Tower in Chicago, and the Jin Mao Tower in Shanghai, as well as the Pearl River Tower in Guangzhou, China. The four buildings are all among the top eleven tallest in the world. Furthermore, the Pearl River Tower is a unique tower that was originally designed to use zero net energy by drawing all its needed power from wind, sunlight, and geothermal mass, though this design goal was not fully achieved.

In October 2010, the owners (Kingdom Holding Company) signed a development agreement with Emaar Properties PJSC. The final height of the building was questionable, but it was still listed to be over 1 kilometre. Kingdom Holding said construction was progressing.

Designs for the foundation were in place by early August 2011 and the contract for the piling was tendered. On 16 August 2011, Langan International officially announced their involvement and that the foundation and piling had to be uniquely designed to overcome subsurface issues such as soft bedrock and porous coral rock, which normally could not support a skyscraper without settling. The concrete must have low permeability to keep out corrosive salt water from the Red Sea. Its depth and size are also considered to be an indicator of what the tower's final height will be. The idea is that it settles evenly enough so that the building doesn't tip or put undue stress on the superstructure. Computer modelling programmes performed tests at the site to confirm that the foundation design would work.

Approvals 
In March and April 2011, several news agencies reported that the Mile-High Tower design had been approved at that height and that the building would cost almost US$30 billion (SR112.5 billion). It and the surrounding City would have had the ability to accommodate 80,000 residents and one million visitors, according to RIA Novosti. Adrian Smith denied that he was a part of any of the earlier designs, which had been purported in the media. One source even corrected its article and clarified the misunderstanding.

Contractors selected 
In early August 2011, the Binladin Group was chosen as the main construction contractor with the signing of an SR4.6 billion contract, which is less than it cost to build the Burj Khalifa (US$1.5 billion). The announcement of the main construction contract signing caused Kingdom Holding Company's stock to jump 3.2% in one day, in addition to KHC already having reported a 21% rise in second-quarter net profit. Also, for the first time, architects Gordon Gill and Adrian Smith officially announced their involvement in the project.

On 13 August 2012, it was announced that the landscaping contract for the Jeddah Tower was to be awarded to Landtech Designs, a US-based company, who will be responsible for irrigating  of green space by using the latest technology in sustainable irrigation. The supply of water to irrigate the green space would be collected through rainwater.

On 21 September 2012, it was announced that financing for the Jeddah Tower was complete. Talal Al Maiman, chief executive officer and managing director of Kingdom Real Estate Development Co. said in an interview "We have all the investors, all the finance, all the money we need," Al Maiman said. "It took us beyond 20 months to convince investors, working every detail and aspect of financing."

On 10 October 2012, Kingdom Holding awarded contracts totalling $98 million. Kingdom Holding Co. has signed a deal with Subul Development Company for the sale of land in the Kingdom Riyadh Land project for $66.5 million. The Kingdom Riyadh Land project, a mixed-use commercial and residential development, will generate more than $5.33 billion of total investment and will house up to 75,000 people. The final master plan contract was awarded to Omrania & Associates and Barton Willmore. Bauer, a German Foundations equipment manufacturer and contractor was awarded a US$32 million contract to support the initial phases of construction of the Jeddah Tower. This includes the installation of 270 bored piles with diameters of 1.5 metres and 1.8 metres. The enabling works are expected to begin before the end of 2012 and take about 10 months to complete.

On 21 February 2013, the Jeddah Economic Company (JEC) announced that it had appointed an EC Harris/Mace joint venture team to project manage the iconic Jeddah Tower project. The team will be providing project, commercial and design management for the Jeddah Tower development. CEO of JEC, Waleed Abduljaleel Batterjee said that the reason Mace was hired is to use the same team that worked for The Shard in London. On the other hand, EC Harris also has a long list of projects in the region including the Grand Millenium Al-Wahda Hotel, Abu Dhabi's largest hotel complex.

On 29 April 2013, news was reported that the Saudi Water Company had signed a 2.2 billion-riyal ($587 million) supply deal with Jeddah Economic Co. for the Jeddah tower project. The 25-year agreement to supply 156,000 cubic metres of treated and drinking water a day, enough for 62 Olympic-size pools, was signed by the chief executive of the Jeddah-based developer, Waleed Batraji, and Loay al-Musallam, head of National Water Company.

Construction begins 
Construction started on 1 April 2013. Piling was completed in December 2013. Above ground construction commenced in September 2014.

In late 2017, the owner of Kingdom Holding Co, which owns 33% of the tower, and the chairman of the Saudi Binladen Group, which owns 17% and is the primary contractor, were arrested as part of the 2017 Saudi Arabian purge. Construction of the tower continued, although some senior managers at Kingdom Holding were redirected to other projects. In February 2018, Mounib Hammoud, CEO of Jeddah Economic City, said that construction is continuing and that they hoped to open the tower by 2020.

In March 2018, Kingdom Holding Company signed a deal with Orange Business Services to provide information and communication technology (ICT) infrastructure to Jeddah Tower. On March 12 construction of the tower moved forward after the delay.

Delay 
There was steady progress, but in January 2018, building owner JEC halted structural concrete work with the tower about one-third completed due to labour issues with a contractor following the 2017–19 Saudi Arabian purge. Since then construction work has been stalled, partially due to the COVID-19 pandemic, and as of March 2023, it is uncertain if or when the tower will be finished.

Design

Challenges 
Sustainability of such a tall building would include problems such as vertical transportation limitations, with elevators only being able to go so far; building swaying, caused by wind; and super column settling, which occurs because concrete tends to shrink as it hydrates and settles under load, whereas steel is dimensionally stable, thereby causing the floors to become uneven. Additionally, a very large core size is required in very tall buildings to support the structure as well as to house the large number of elevators needed. The core size consumes a significant amount of the space on the lower and middle floors. One of the ways Jeddah Tower attempts to overcome these problems is with its smooth, sloped-exterior design, which, although more expensive to build, offers superior aerodynamic performance over "stepped" designs such as the Burj Khalifa, allowing it to have a more conservative core overall. This was determined by wind tunnel tests performed at Burj Khalifa. Jeddah Tower will also use copious stiffening materials to prevent the excessive swaying that would otherwise make the occupants of upper floors nauseated on windy days, including very high strength concrete that will be up to several metres thick in certain parts of the core. This, along with the highly integrated steel frame and shear walls, is also intended to prevent catastrophic failure of the structure in the event of a terrorist attack. Traditionally, the space consumed by elevators was considered to make a building become increasingly less profitable past 80 floors or so. More recently, it has been the advent of truly mixed-use design such as Shanghai Tower and Burj Khalifa, as well as improved building technology, that have outdated this rule of thumb, which generally applied to single use buildings.

Like Burj Khalifa, Jeddah employs a similar Y-shaped, triangular footprint which promotes stability and increases window views, as well as a tapering form, with the sheer height and wind being the biggest structural design challenge. The smooth, sloped façade of Jeddah Tower particularly induces a beneficial phenomenon known as "wind vortex shedding." Normally when wind swirls around the leeward side of a building, rushing in from both sides to fill the low pressure zone, it would create tornado like vortices, which would rock the building from side to side due to variations in pressure, direction and velocity. The dynamic façade of Jeddah Tower, however, creates an infinite timing differential (whereas Burj Khalifa is limited by the number of steps) in air pressure exertion in any one particular direction, thus creating a more stable structure, as there is no broad area of outstanding pressure or depression at any given time. Put simply, a smooth taper is more aerodynamic than an irregular or jagged taper, while both are advantageous over rectangular geometries. At Jeddah Tower's height, it is considered essentially unfeasible to use a traditional square design.

External form 
The triangular footprint and sloped exterior of Jeddah Tower is designed to reduce wind loads; its high surface area also makes it ideal for residential use. The overall design of the tower, which will be located near both the Red Sea and the mouth of the Obhur Creek (Sharm Ob'hur) where it widens as it meets the Red Sea, as well as having frontage on a man-made waterway and harbour that will be built around it, is intended to look like a desert plant shooting upwards as a symbol of Saudi Arabia's growth and future, as well as to add prominence to Jeddah's status as the gateway into the holy city of Mecca. The designer's vision was "one that represents the new spirit in Saudi Arabia" (Smith). The 23 hectare (57 acre) area around Jeddah Tower will contain public space and a shopping mall, as well as other residential and commercial developments, and be known as the Jeddah Tower Water Front District, of which, the tower's site alone will take up . As with many other very tall skyscrapers, including the Kingdom Centre in Riyadh, which is generally considered to have sparked the recent significant commercial developments around it in the district of Olaya, much of the intention of Jeddah Tower is to be symbolic as well as to raise the surrounding land value rather than its own profitability. To that effect, the tower's architect, Adrian Smith, said that the tower "evokes a bundle of leaves shooting up from the ground; a burst of new life that heralds more growth all around it". Smith states that the tower will create a landmark in which it and the surrounding Jeddah Economic City are interdependent. Talal Al Maiman, a board member of Jeddah Economic Company, said, "Jeddah Tower will be a landmark structure that will greatly increase the value of the hundreds of other properties around it in Jeddah Economic City and indeed throughout North Jeddah." The concept of profitability derived from building high density developments and malls around such a landmark was taken from the Burj Khalifa, where it has proven successful, as its surrounding malls, hotels and condominiums in the area known as Downtown Dubai have generated the most considerable revenue out of that project as a whole, while the Burj Khalifa itself made little or no profit.

Elevators 

The building will have a total of 59 elevators, five of which will be double-deck elevators, as well as 12 escalators. The elevators are made by the Finnish company Kone. It will also have the highest observation deck in the world, to which high speed elevators will travel at up to 10 metres (33 feet) per second (36 km/h or 22 mph) in both directions. They must also be efficient so the cables are not unbearably heavy. Jeddah Tower will have three sky lobbies where elevator transfers can be made, and no elevator will go from the bottom to the highest occupied floor. No official floor count has been given; however, Smith stated in a television interview that it will be about 50 floors more than the Burj Khalifa, which has 163 occupied floors, leading to the inference that Jeddah Tower will have over 200 floors. The tower will also feature a large, roughly  diameter outdoor balcony, known as the sky terrace, on one side of the building for private use by the penthouse floor at level 157; it is not the observation deck. It was originally intended to be a helipad, but it was revealed to be an unsuitable landing environment by helicopter pilots. The lower air density, exacerbated by the thin desert atmosphere, will cause the outdoor air temperature towards the top of the tower to be lower than the ground level air, which will provide natural cooling. There is also significantly more air flow (wind) at heights, which is very strong at one kilometre and had a large impact on the structural design of the tower. The Burj Khalifa actually takes in the cooler, cleaner air from the top floors and uses it to air condition the building. Jeddah Tower will be oriented such that no façade directly faces the sun; it will also use the condensate water from the air conditioning system for irrigation and other purposes throughout the building.

To overcome elevator issues, the tower will use its large number of efficient elevators as well as its three sky lobbies, which allows transfers to be made between elevators serving a specific area with no elevator being overburdened. Much was learned from Burj Khalifa that helped with the design of Jeddah Tower not only structurally, but in methods for designing practical mechanical, electrical, and plumbing (MEP) systems, as well as adhering to local regulations and international building codes. Despite all the physical challenges, Adrian Smith states that practicality is still the greater challenge over structural durability, even in such super-tall designs, and that as with all buildings, Jeddah Tower's form was primarily derived respective of what the building's uses would be, then in accordance with the structural factors that would have to be considered to deliver it. Orange S.A. are designing the information and communications infrastructure of the building.

Internal systems 
Chicago-based Environmental Systems Design, Inc. will provide mechanical, plumbing, electrical and fire protection engineering, as well as teledata, audio/visual, security systems, and acoustics. Langan International will be responsible for geotechnical engineering as well as some ground level site work such as transportation engineering and parking, including the design of the proposed 3,000–4,700 car underground parking garage that will be located near, but not under the tower to prevent terrorism. Langan also designed the tower's foundation, which has to be able to support the tower despite the less than optimal subsurface conditions, such as soft rock and permeable coral, which could cause the piles to settle. Thornton Tomasetti has provided the structural engineering for two of the previous world's tallest building title holders, the Petronas Towers in Kuala Lumpur, and the Taipei 101 in Taiwan, as well as the under construction Ping An Finance Centre in Shenzhen, which will be the second tallest building in China after completion. Saudi Binladin Group is the largest construction firm in the Middle East, with over 35,000 workers and hundreds of projects. They recently constructed the topped-out  Abraj Al-Bait Clock Tower in Mecca, which is the tallest building in Saudi Arabia and third tallest in the world, as well as the largest skyscraper in the world by floor area and volume. Aside from buildings, the firm has also constructed many major infrastructure projects, such as the King Abdulaziz (Jeddah) International Airport expansion and the  six lane Al Qassim Expressway through Saudi Arabia. Saudi Binladin Group is owned by the family of the late al-Qaeda leader Osama bin Laden. As a result, it has sparked some minor media buzz. When asked his thoughts about this in an interview, Adrian Smith simply stated that they are the largest construction firm in the Middle East, most significant work in Saudi Arabia was done by them, and that it is a very large family that shouldn't be stereotyped by one of its members. Furthermore, in January 2012, New York City judge George B. Daniels ruled that no charges could be filed against SBG to repay the victims of 9/11 as there is no evidence of the construction firm financially supporting bin Laden after he was removed as a shareholder following the 1993 World Trade Center bombing.

Economic viability 
In addition to its primary functions, the building is slated to include a significant amount of retail as well as a wide variety of other unique amenities with the intention that it functions as a nearly self-sustaining entity, approaching the concept of a "vertical city". The building's design has been applauded as simple and feasible, yet bold, brilliantly sculpted, and high-tech, with AS + GG describing it as "an elegant, cost-efficient and highly constructible design." The estimated construction cost of US$1.23 billion, which is less than that of the Burj Khalifa (US$1.5 billion), can be attributed to cheap labour in the Middle East, particularly Saudi Arabia, and that three shifts will work around the clock to expedite the process. Construction costs have also declined since the global financial crisis.

In July 2011, a report by consultancy EC Harris found that Saudi Arabia is the cheapest country in the Middle East to build in, half as expensive as Bahrain, and 34% cheaper than the United Arab Emirates, where Burj Khalifa is located. The future towers' site is located in very close proximity to King Abdulaziz (Jeddah) International Airport, whose runways nearly align with the towers' site, which will have an effect on the airspace. While skyscraper experts have stated that towers well over one kilometre, even two kilometres (6,562 feet) high, are technically feasible, physical sustainability and practicality issues come into play in towers of this height. As for physical restraints, Bart Leclercq, head of structures for WSP Middle East recently said, "I truly believe that 1 mile, 1.6 kilometres, is within range. Over that, it may be possible if there are improvements in concrete quality. But 2 km is too big a figure; it's just a step too far at the moment."

Impact
There is an impending real estate bubble in Saudi Arabia, with increasing demand and rising prices due to high population growth and a short supply of housing, which may include a demand for high-end luxury units, such as those in Jeddah Tower. To boost growth, the Saudi Arabian government is going to invest US$67 billion (SR251 billion) in building 500,000 homes throughout the country. According to Saudi officials, about 900 new homes are needed a day to meet the demand of the rapidly growing population, which has nearly quadrupled in the past four decades.

Just as the Jeddah Tower will complement the Jeddah Economic City development that will be built around it, there are many infrastructure and revitalisation projects underway and planned throughout Saudi Arabia, such as the US$7.2 billion (SR27.1 billion) new airport terminal under construction at King Abdulaziz (Jeddah) International Airport, that will complement the Jeddah Economic City as well as develop Saudi Arabia, which has been likened to a Third World country with crumbling infrastructure and widespread disasters, including severe flooding, such as the flash floods in early 2011 that damaged 90% of the roads and over 27,000 buildings in Jeddah. According to a representative of Standard Chartered, which invested US$75 million in Saudi Binladin Group, Saudi Arabia is going to spend over US$400 billion (SR1.5 trillion) on infrastructure over the next few years. According to reports by Citi Investment Research & Analysis, $220 billion worth of development, accounting for 36% of all construction spending in the MENA region, will be directly or indirectly beneficial to Jeddah Tower. Jeddah Tower and City themselves are intended to set an example of green development, using modern technology and having a low carbon footprint relative to the number of people they will support. However, there is also an increasing problem of poor education levels in Arab countries due to a lack of spending in research and education, which it is argued should be invested in rather than building skyscrapers, and that the tower is nothing more than a symbol of hubris. It has even been likened to the Tower of Babel.

Furthermore, economists have found large new skyscrapers to be a negative economic indicator, with several instances of new tallest buildings being finished and opening into a bad economy, as they generally start during a financial boom when money is easy and investment is strong, but do not finish until the bubble has burst. Examples include the Singer Building and Metropolitan Life Insurance Building after the Panic of 1907, 40 Wall Street, the Chrysler Building and the Empire State Building built during the Great Depression, the World Trade Center and Sears Tower built during the 1970s economic downturn, the Petronas Towers built during the Asian Crisis of the late 1990s and the Burj Khalifa built during the Great Recession. Much of the study on this phenomenon was done in 1999 by Andrew Lawrence, a research director at Deutsche Bank who created the "skyscraper index," originally as a joke; however, it illustrated the observation that many of the world's tallest buildings have been built on the eve of financial collapse.

Reception
The developers' theory is that the international attention gained through large developments and having the world's tallest building will incur gentrification of the country and even be a financial success in the long run. Architect Adrian Smith, the designer of the tower, states, "...this tower symbolizes the Kingdom as an important global business and cultural leader, and demonstrates the strength and creative vision of its people. It represents new growth and high-performance technology fused into one powerful iconic form." However, Bob Sinn, principal engineer at Thornton Tomasetti, stated that the practical challenges of building very tall buildings are greater than the structural challenges.

"We intend [Jeddah] Tower to become both an economic engine and a proud symbol of the kingdom's economic and cultural stature in the world community," said Talal Al Maiman, a board member of both Kingdom Holding Company and Jeddah Economic Company. The project's primary proponent, Prince Al-Waleed said, "Building this tower in Jeddah sends a financial and economic message that should not be ignored. It has a political depth to it to tell the world that we Saudis invest in our country."

Gallery

Floor directory 
It is estimated that the Jeddah Tower will have just over 200 floors.

See also

 List of tallest buildings
 List of future tallest buildings
 The Illinois

Notes
 A. ^ The actual height of the Burj Khalifa was not revealed until the opening ceremony. In 2014, online sources were using the number .

 B. ^ This figure has been referred to as the "total building area" in publications, which is probably another term for gross floor area; the actual usable floor space, which is what buildings are typically measured by, will presumably be less.

 C. ^ This assumes a 2012 start date and the estimated completion time of 63 months.

 E. ^ No official floor count has been given; however, Adrian Smith said it will be about 50 floors taller than the (163-floor) Burj Khalifa. In November 2010, an older kilometre-high design was said to contain over 200 floors.

References

External links

 Kingdom Holding Company website
 Jeddah Tower on the CTBUH Skyscraper Center
 Slideshow image gallery of renderings by Fox News
 Jeddah Tower on Twitter
 Construction Timelapse on YouTube

Skyscrapers in Jeddah
Buildings and structures under construction in Saudi Arabia
Neo-futurism architecture
2020 in Saudi Arabia